Kitling Peak is an  mountain summit in the Cascade Range in the U.S. state of Washington. It is located one mile northwest of Easy Pass on the borders of the Stephen Mather Wilderness and North Cascades National Park. The mountain's name "Kitling" derives from Chinook Jargon "ketling" which means kettle. The mountain takes its name from Kitling Lake which is one mile north of the peak. The name was officially adopted in 1969 by the U.S. Board on Geographic Names. Kitling Peak is situated at the east end of Ragged Ridge. Other peaks on Ragged Ridge include Mesahchie Peak, Kimtah Peak, Katsuk Peak, and Graybeard Peak. The nearest higher peak is Mesahchie Peak,  to the south. The Mesahchie Glacier on Kitling's northwest slope forms the headwaters of Panther Creek. Precipitation runoff on the east side of the mountain drains into Ross Lake via Granite Creek, whereas the west side of the peak drains into Diablo Lake via Panther Creek and Fisher Creek.

Climate
Kitling Peak is located in the marine west coast climate zone of western North America. Most weather fronts originate in the Pacific Ocean, and travel northeast toward the Cascade Mountains. As fronts approach the North Cascades, they are forced upward by the peaks of the Cascade Range (Orographic lift), causing them to drop their moisture in the form of rain or snowfall onto the Cascades. As a result, the west side of the North Cascades experiences high precipitation, especially during the winter months in the form of snowfall. During winter months, weather is usually cloudy, but, due to high pressure systems over the Pacific Ocean that intensify during summer months, there is often little or no cloud cover during the summer. Because of maritime influence, snow tends to be wet and heavy, resulting in high avalanche danger.

Geology

The North Cascades features some of the most rugged topography in the Cascade Range with craggy peaks, spires, ridges, and deep glacial valleys. Geological events occurring many years ago created the diverse topography and drastic elevation changes over the Cascade Range leading to the various climate differences.

The history of the formation of the Cascade Mountains dates back millions of years ago to the late Eocene Epoch. With the North American Plate overriding the Pacific Plate, episodes of volcanic igneous activity persisted. In addition, small fragments of the oceanic and continental lithosphere called terranes created the North Cascades about 50 million years ago.

During the Pleistocene period dating back over two million years ago, glaciation advancing and retreating repeatedly scoured the landscape leaving deposits of rock debris. The "U"-shaped cross section of the river valleys are a result of recent glaciation. Uplift and faulting in combination with glaciation have been the dominant processes which have created the tall peaks and deep valleys of the North Cascades area.

See also

 Geography of the North Cascades
 Geology of the Pacific Northwest

References

External links
 Weather forecast: Kitling Peak

Mountains of Washington (state)
Mountains of Skagit County, Washington
North Cascades
Cascade Range
Chinook Jargon place names
North American 2000 m summits